Clarence E. Page Municipal Airport  is a public-use airport owned by the city of Oklahoma City and located in Canadian County, Oklahoma, United States. It is 15 nautical miles (28 km) west of the central business district of Oklahoma City, but still within its city limits. This airport is included in the FAA's National Plan of Integrated Airport Systems (2009–2013), which categorizes it as a general aviation airport.

Although most U.S. airports use the same three-letter location identifier for the FAA and IATA, this airport is assigned RCE by the FAA but has no designation from the IATA (which assigned RCE to Roche Harbor Seaplane Base in Washington.).

Facilities and aircraft
It has two runways with concrete surfaces: 17R/35L is 6,014 by 100 feet (1,833 x 30 m) and 17L/35R is 3,502 by 75 feet (1,067 x 23 m).

For the 12-month period ending July 2, 2008, the airport had 25,000 aircraft operations, an average of 68 per day, all of which were general aviation. At that time there were 52 aircraft based at this airport: 73% single-engine, 2% multi-engine, 6% helicopter and 19% ultralight.

History
Opened in October, 1941, the airport conducted contract basic flying training for the United States Army Air Forces. Known as Cimarron Field, the wartime airport had five grass runways, with the runways being changed at various times, with three auxiliary airfields used for emergency and overflow landings/takeoffs. The contractor was Oklahoma Air College, Inc. Flying training was performed with Fairchild PT-19s as the primary trainer. Several PT-17 Stearmans and a few P-40 Warhawks were also assigned to Cimarron Field. 

Cimarron Field was inactivated on 27 June 1944 with the drawdown of AAFTC's pilot training program. The airfield was turned over to civil control at the end of the war though the War Assets Administration (WAA).

This airport hosted the 18th World Aerobatic Championship from 18 to 30 August 1996.

See also

Other airports owned by Oklahoma City include:
 Will Rogers World Airport, served by seven major airlines, regional and charter airlines
 Wiley Post Airport, a corporate and business jet general aviation airport
 Oklahoma World War II Army Airfields
 31st Flying Training Wing (World War II)

References

 Manning, Thomas A. (2005), History of Air Education and Training Command, 1942–2002.  Office of History and Research, Headquarters, AETC, Randolph AFB, Texas 
 Shaw, Frederick J. (2004), Locating Air Force Base Sites, History’s Legacy, Air Force History and Museums Program, United States Air Force, Washington DC.

External links
 Clarence E. Page Municipal Airport at Oklahoma Aeronautics Commission website
 
 
 

1941 establishments in Oklahoma
USAAF Contract Flying School Airfields
Airfields of the United States Army Air Forces in Oklahoma
Airports in Oklahoma
Buildings and structures in Canadian County, Oklahoma
Transportation in Oklahoma City
Airports established in 1941
USAAF Central Flying Training Command
American Theater of World War II